Leopold Gratz CGIH (4 November 1929, Vienna – 2 March 2006, Vienna) was an Austrian politician.

Born in Vienna, Gratz was a law graduate from Vienna University and a member of the Austrian Social Democratic Party (SPÖ). From 1963 to 1966 he was a member of the Bundesrat, from 1970 to 1971 Federal Minister of Education and the Arts. From 1966 to 1973 he served as a member of The National Council of Austria and from 1986 to 1989 as the President of The National Council of Austria, and from 1971 to 1973 as the leader of the Socialist group in the Parliament of Austria.

From 1973 to 1984 he was Mayor of Vienna and head of Vienna's municipal government. In 1976, he became chairman of the Vienna chapter of the Austrian Social Democratic Party. From 1984 to 1986 he was the  Minister of Foreign Affairs. From 1986 to 1989 he was the President of the National Council. His term of office as Mayor of Vienna was overshadowed by the "Bauring" affair and the scandal around the construction of the Vienna General Hospital. He decided to resign from the government in 1989 following another scandal, the Udo Proksch affair. Burdening his authority as the second highest politician of the Republic of Austria, Gratz well-meaningly had tried to protect his close friend Udo Proksch, who later was convicted of the murder of six seamen and received a life sentence, from criminal prosecution. After Gratz has decided to abandon politics, he remained a member of the party executive committee of the SPÖ Vienna as well as president of the International Conference on Kampuchea (ICK) by request of the United Nations Organization (UNO).

In 1979, Leopold Gratz was named a Knight of the Grand Cross of the Order of Saint Silvester by Pope John Paul II. In 1995, Leopold Gratz was officially made an Honorary Citizen of Vienna, the capital of the Republic of Austria. In 2010, a square behind the Austrian parliament in downtown Vienna was named after Leopold Gratz (Leopold-Gratz-Square).

Awards and honors

References

|-
| width="30%" align="center" | Preceded by:Felix Slavik
| width="40%" align="center" | Mayor of Vienna1973 — 1984
| width="30%" align="center" | Succeeded by: Helmut Zilk
|-

1929 births
2006 deaths
20th-century Austrian people
Foreign ministers of Austria
Mayors of Vienna
Social Democratic Party of Austria politicians
Presidents of the National Council (Austria)
Members of the National Council (Austria)
People from Ottakring
Burials at the Vienna Central Cemetery